Slangerup Speedway Klub is a speedway club from Slangerup in Denmark, who compete in the Danish Speedway League.

History
The club were formed during the Easter of 1967 by Børge O. Christiansen. The team runs at the Slangerup Speedway Centre which opened in 1967.

The team have won the Danish Speedway League title on four occasions in 1988, 2008, 2010 and 2011.

Teams

2022 team

References 

Danish speedway teams